Dread Central is an American website founded in 2006 that is dedicated to horror news, interviews, and reviews. It covers horror films, comics, novels, and toys. Dread Central has won the Rondo Hatton Classic Horror Award for Best Website four times and was selected as AMC's Site of the Week in 2008.

History 
Dread Central was founded on July 4, 2006. When a venture to create a horror-themed cable television channel stalled, the web team left and established their own news site. In 2012, a negative review posted by Scott Foy attracted controversy when Foy and the film's director, Jim Wynorski, engaged in a verbal altercation online. On September 30, 2019, Jonathan Barkan announced he was stepping down as editor-in-chief. As of December 2021, Mary Beth McAndrews is now Editor-in-Chief and Josh Korngut is managing editor.

Website 
The site's staff use horror-themed aliases. The website has a broad focus, and it covers both mainstream and fringe topics that range from horror films to comics to toys. Besides reviews and news, they also host several podcasts. Steve Persall of the Tampa Bay Times states, "if it gushes blood or desecrates flesh, Dread Central covers it." The site is oriented toward a male demographic and favors edgy, exploitative films.

After 10 years, Dread Central became reader-supported via Patreon. This would make Dread Central the first genre news site to switch from being ad-supported to being crowd supported. Celebrity supporters include John Carpenter, Gale Anne Hurd, Sid Haig, Adam Green, and Darren Lynn Bousman.

Other ventures 
In 2007, Dread Central and VersusMedia announced Horror D'Oeuvres, a competition for independent short films. In 2008, the site partnered with several other prominent horror sites and studios in a horror-themed auction to raise money for the Entertainment Industry Foundation. In 2013, they partnered with Gas Lamp Museum and the San Diego Ghost Hunters to organize a ghost hunt at the William Heath Davis House.  The proceeds went toward upkeep for the historic site. Also in 2013, they began offering the "Box of Dread", a random package full of merchandise delivered monthly to subscribers, one of whom is randomly chosen to receive a "special edition" valued at $250.

CineMayhem 

CineMayhem, a film festival for independent genre films, was founded by Heather Wixson in association with Dread Central's Indie Horror Month. The festival, whose inaugural date was March 2–3, 2013, is presented in Thousand Oaks, California. The festival is backed by Scream Factory, Sideshow Collectibles, Magnet Releasing, and Breaking Glass Pictures.

Reaper Awards 

Dread Central and Home Media Magazine present the Reaper Awards annually for the best home video releases and direct-to-video features. It is held at the Hollywood Roosevelt Hotel and is hosted by Steve Barton, co-founder of Dread Central.

DREAD 
In 2017, Dread Central Media was acquired by Epic Pictures Group. The independent studio announced it would be launching a new distribution label specializing in horror films released in theaters and on demand. On January 29, 2019, the label was renamed DREAD. Their first in-house produced film, The Golem, will be the first film under the DREAD Originals banner.

 Book of Monsters 
 Candy Corn
 Director's Cut 
 Ditched 
 Extremity 
 The Golem
 Imitation Girl 
 Lasso
 The Lodgers
 Sacrifice
 Slay Belles 
 Terrifier
 To Hell and Back: The Kane Hodder Story
 Uncle Peckerhead
 Vidar the Vampire 
 Villmark Asylum 
 Zombiology: Enjoy Yourself Tonight 
 Zone of the Dead

DreadXP 
DreadXP was founded in 2019 by Dread Central editor Ted Hentschke as a video gaming website with a focus on editorial, reviews, podcasts, and original streaming content. In 2020, DreadXP turned to video game publishing with the release of Dread X Collection, an anthology of horror video games created by several indie developers.

Games published

Reception 
Dread Central was chosen as AMC's Site of the Week, in 2008.

It was nominated for Total Film's Best Horror Blog, in 2010.

It won the Rondo Hatton Classic Horror Award for Best Website for the years 2009-2012.

References

External links 
 
 DreadXP website

American entertainment news websites
Horror fiction websites
Internet properties established in 2006